Melapium lineatum is a species of sea snail, a marine gastropod mollusk in the family Strepsiduridae.

Distribution 
South Africa.

References 

Strepsiduridae
Gastropods of Africa